Beaver Harbour is a community on the Fundy shore of New Brunswick, Canada.

Most of the community forms the Local service district of Beaver Harbour, which was established in 1971. It is also a census subdivision of Census Canada. Since the formation of the LSD, the community has expanded past the original boundaries into the LSD of the parish of Pennfield.

In 1866 it had about 30 resident families, and grew to a population of 150 by 1871, the 500 in 1898. As of 2021, the population was 291.

It is the site of the Lighthouse Point Light, originally built in 1875 and subsequently rebuilt. It is a fiberglass tapered cylindrical tower with balcony and lantern.

References

Communities in Charlotte County, New Brunswick
Designated places in New Brunswick
Local service districts of Charlotte County, New Brunswick